"Downing Street Kindling" was the second single to be taken from Larrikin Love's debut album, The Freedom Spark, and their first release to enter the UK Top 40, charting at number 35.

In the song, Larrikin voices his discontent with England, culminating with the proclamation that "I think that it is hell". The title refers to the home of the British Prime Minister, and references one of the song's key lyrics, "I will build a fire in Westminster using the door of Downing Street"

Track listing

CD

 "Downing Street Kindling"
 "Dead Long Dead"

7" Vinyl 1
 "Downing Street Kindling"
 "Is It December?"

7" Vinyl 2
 ""Downing Street Kindling Refix"

2006 singles
Larrikin Love songs
2006 songs
Warner Records singles
Song articles with missing songwriters